NGC 445 is a peculiar lenticular galaxy located in the constellation of Cetus. It was discovered on October 23, 1864 by Albert Marth. It was described by Dreyer as "very faint, very small."

References

External links
 

0445
18641023
Cetus (constellation)
Lenticular galaxies
Discoveries by Albert Marth
004493